Robert J. "Bob" Kaehler (born April 5, 1964, in San Mateo, California) is an American rower. He finished 5th in the men's eight at the 1996 Summer Olympics and the 2000 Summer Olympics.

Education 
Kaehler is a graduate of the Columbia University College of Physicians and Surgeons (1991) with an MS in Physical Therapy.

Career 
Kaehler started his sports career as an athlete on the U.S. National Rowing Team. His athletic career spanned over a decade and included two world university games, several world cup events, seven world championships, and three Olympic games.  Kaehler's results include: Olympics—1992 (M4X—8th), 1996 (M8+ -- 5th), 2000 (M8+ -- 5th); World Champion M8+ -- 1994, 1997, 1998, and 1999.

Kaehler trained with some of the world's most successful rowing coaches including Igor Grinko, Mike Spracklen and Mike Teti.  The exposure to these diverse training methods and philosophies helped shape Kaehler's singular perspective on conditioning and athletic performance.

Kaehler remains the most successful U.S. male heavyweight rower at the world championships level with his four world titles, including a three-straight streak (1997–1999) with U.S. coach Mike Teti.  For his wins and contributions to the sport of U.S. rowing, Kaehler was inducted into the Rowing Hall of Fame in March 2012.

Along with three titles (San Diego Training Center U.S.A. -- Men's 8+) Kaehler still holds current records at the Henley Royal Regatta (Barrier and Fawley).  Held annually since 1839 (except for two world wars), the Henley Royal Regatta is one of the world's oldest and most prestigious rowing races held in Henley-on-Thames, England.

Personal life 
Kaehler lives with his wife and three children in Pennsylvania.

References

External links 
 
 

1964 births
Living people
Rowers from Buffalo, New York
Rowers at the 1992 Summer Olympics
Rowers at the 1996 Summer Olympics
Rowers at the 2000 Summer Olympics
Olympic rowers of the United States
American male rowers
World Rowing Championships medalists for the United States
Pan American Games medalists in rowing
Pan American Games gold medalists for the United States
Rowers at the 1995 Pan American Games